David William Browne (born 4 April 1964) is an English cricketer. He played eight first-class matches for Cambridge University Cricket Club between 1985 and 1986, including the 1986  University Match in which he scored the winning runs.

He was educated at Stamford School and St Catharine's College, Cambridge.

See also
 List of Cambridge University Cricket Club players

References

External links
 

1964 births
Living people
English cricketers
Alumni of St Catharine's College, Cambridge
Cambridge University cricketers
People educated at Stamford School
People from Stamford, Lincolnshire